Astartea onycis, commonly known as clawed astartea, is a shrub endemic to Western Australia.

The shrub is found in the South West region of Western Australia.

References

Eudicots of Western Australia
onycis
Endemic flora of Western Australia
Plants described in 2013
Taxa named by Barbara Lynette Rye
Taxa named by Malcolm Eric Trudgen